"" is the national anthem of Panama. The music was composed by Santos A. Jorge, and the lyrics were written by Jeronimo de la Ossa. It is also known by its incipit, "" ("At last we reached victory").

The song is directed to the average, working-class Panamanian, with such lyrics as "Ahead the shovel and pick; At work without any more dilation".

History 
In 1897, Spanish-born musician Santos Jorge composed the "Himno Istmeño", which was initially a student song but reached levels of popularity among the population. Jorge had composed the official music for the anthem, but it had no lyrics, so he told his friend Jerónimo Ossa to write lyrics for it. However, this song is not the same as the one currently performed, since it underwent some changes. No records are found of how or by whom the changes were made to the original anthem.

Upon independence from Colombia in 1903, William I. Buchanan, the United States' first ambassador and minister plenipotentiary to Panama, was to present credentials to the Provisional Junta of Government, and there was no anthem to perform, as required by usual protocol. Jorge suggested that his anthem be used for such an occasion, which was accepted, since the song was supported by the general public. Jorge asked his friend Jerónimo Ossa to write lyrics, to which he agreed and wrote the lyrics for the Panamanian national anthem.

In 1906, the National Assembly adopted the anthem in accordance with Law 39 and provisionally, since it was decided to hold a contest to choose a new composition. The Panamanian people chose it again. Later, in the 1941 Constitution, an article was included that definitively adopted the National Anthem as a symbol of the nation.

In 2012, the National Anthem was recorded digitally for the first time, since there was no digital version of it. It was made available to the general public to be downloaded free of charge.

Lyrics

References

External links 
Descarga Simbolos de la Nación
Panama: Himno Istmeño - Audio of the national anthem of Panama, with information and lyrics (archive link)
Versión vocal it has upade of radio broadcast television version

North American anthems
Panamanian music
National symbols of Panama
Spanish-language songs
National anthems
National anthem compositions in D major
1903 songs